is a Japanese manga artist known for her manga series Ace o Nerae!.

Biography
Sumika Yamamoto is a shōjo manga artist born on June 17, 1949. She debuted as a manga artist in 1971 with "Sono Hitokoto ga ienakute" in the manga magazine Margaret before achieving success with "Ace o Nerae". In 1981, she moved back to her home town Enzan and stopped her artistic output in order to cultivate spirituality.

Manga Works
"Sono Hitokoto ga ienakute" ("Without saying that very single word")
"Ace o Nerae!" ("Aim for the ace!", Margaret 1972–1975, 1978–1980)
"Kiss ni Goyoujin" ("With a kiss", Margaret, 1973)
"Nanatsu no Eldorado" ("The seven Eldorados", Margaret, 1975–1977)
"Hikkuri kaetta omocha bako" ("The toy that tumbled down", Margaret, 1978)
"H2O! Zendai mimon!" ("H2O! Unprecedent!", Margaret, 1979)
"Ai no Ogonritsu" (Shogakukan Lady Comics, 1 volume, 1983)
"Hakuran Seifuu" ("Cool breeze of knowledge", issues 15, 17 to 22 of Petit Flower 1983 - 1984)
"Hayami Daisuke Funsenki" ("The fighter Hayami Daisuke", issue 16 of Petit Flower, 2 volumes, 1983)
"Koi Shichaou kana?" ("Love alphabet?", Margaret, 1 volume)

References

External links
Bio: Yamamoto, Sumika 

1949 births
Living people
Women manga artists
Manga artists from Yamanashi Prefecture
Japanese female comics artists